Out of the Ether is a 1933 short animated film distributed by Columbia Pictures, featuring Krazy Kat.

Plot
Krazy, dressed as a surgeon, appears as though he is working on a patient. When he is done, and the fellow surgeons step aside, the patient turns out to be an animated radio. Krazy puts his newly repaired radio on a flying carpet before taking off.

Up in the sky, Krazy passes by a hot air balloon which resembles Paul Whiteman. Riding on that balloon are the fancy thin clarinet-playing man who once appeared in The Bandmaster, and the Mills Brothers. Under the balloon hangs a piano at which the Boswell Sisters sit by. Further on the way, Marie Dressler is sitting on a crescent moon and singing. Dressler boards on Krazy's carpet, and dances with the cat. They dance until the woman accidentally pushes Krazy off the carpet.

Upon falling off, Krazy lands on some clouds. On one of them, two mysterious boxers wearing turbans trade punches. This goes until one of them accidentally bumps Krazy off.

Krazy falls from the sky once more. Finally he hits the ground bottom first. His radio follows as it falls on and gets pierced by his head.

Music
Popular songs featured in the film include Tiger Rag and When the Moon Comes over the Mountain.

See also
 Krazy Kat filmography

References

External links
Out of the Ether at the Big Cartoon Database

1933 short films
American animated short films
American black-and-white films
1933 animated films
Krazy Kat shorts
Columbia Pictures short films
1930s American animated films
Columbia Pictures animated short films
Screen Gems short films